Kocmyrzów  is a village in the administrative district of Gmina Kocmyrzów-Luborzyca, within Kraków County, Lesser Poland Voivodeship, in southern Poland.

The village has an approximate population of 700.

History 

As a result of the Partitions of Poland (1772–1795), the Galicia area and Kraków were attributed to the Habsburg Monarchy. Kocmyrzów was in the Bezirkshauptmannschaft (powiat?) of Kraków area  when the post-office was opened in Austrian Galicia in 1878.

For more details, see the article Kingdom of Galicia and Lodomeria.

References

Villages in Kraków County